Yuen Long is an MTR Light Rail stop in Hong Kong. It is located at ground level underneath Sun Yuen Long Centre in Yuen Long District of the New Territories, and is the northeasternmost Light Rail stop. It is connected to Tuen Ma line Yuen Long station.

Station layout

References

External links
MTR Yuen Long Station location map

MTR Light Rail stops
Yuen Long District
Former Kowloon–Canton Railway stations
Railway stations in Hong Kong opened in 1988